Ariel Behar and Giovanni Lapentti were the defending champions but chose not to defend their title.

Juan Ignacio Londero and Luis David Martínez won the title after defeating Daniel Elahi Galán and Santiago Giraldo 6–4, 6–4 in the final.

Seeds

Draw

References
 Main Draw

Milex Open - Doubles
2017 Doubles